Léon-Georges Morel was a Belgian colonial administrator. He was Governor of Léopoldville Province in the Belgian Congo from 1946 to 1950.

Career

Léon-Georges Morel was born on 9 April 1892. 
He joined the colonial service on 26 February 1920 as a territorial administrator 2nd class.
He was  territorial administrator of Thysville (Cataractes-Sud) when the Kimbanguist movement emerged in Nkamba in 1921.
Simon Kimbangu began his healing mission as a prophet in the village of Nkamba on 6 April 1921.
Morel wrote of the movement: "The concern for peace and public tranquility implicitly requires that it be brought to an end calmly but without delay ...".
The Belgian authorities were worried that Kimbangu might lead a revolt, and on 6 June 1921 Morel ordered his arrest.
He was captured some time after, found guilty of disturbing the public order and sentenced to death. The King intervened and his sentence was reduced to life imprisonment, which he served for 30 years in Elisabethville (Katanga).

In 1922 Morel was promoted to territorial administrator 2st class.
In 1926 he was appointed principal territorial administrator.
In 1928 Morel became deputy district commissioner in Boma (Bas-Congo). 
From 1932 he was deputy district commissioner under F. De Bok in the urban district of Léopoldville.

From 1934 to 1942 Morel was district commissioner in Léopoldville.
In September-November 1939 the authorities were informed that the Mission des Noirs (Mission of the Blacks) had been founded in the Bas Congo and Léopoldville.
Morel reported that the Vicar Apostolic of Kisantu, Mgr  (1885-1964), had told him that Simon Mpadi was the promoter of the new movement, and that the Salvation Army adjutant Henri Becquet denied any influence of the Salvation Army.

Morel was governor of Léopoldville Province from 1946 to 1950.
He succeeded Marcel Maquet (1891–1964) and was succeeded by Lucien Lardinois (1898–1956).
After returning to Belgium he served as secretary general of the Royal Belgian Colonial Union.
Morel received the Royal Order of the Lion on 8 April 1946, and on 20 August 1949 was promoted to commander of this order.

Notes

Sources

1892 births
Governors of Léopoldville Province
Governors of provinces of the Belgian Congo
Year of death missing